The 1929 Mercer Bears football team was an American football team that represented Mercer University as a member of the Southern Intercollegiate Athletic Association (SIAA) during the 1929 college football season. In their first year under head coach Lake Russell, the team compiled a 2–7 record.

Schedule

References

Mercer
Mercer Bears football seasons
Mercer Bears football